The 2022–23 season is the 103rd season in the history of CA Osasuna and their fourth consecutive season in the top flight. The club are participating in La Liga and the Copa del Rey.

Players

First-team squad

Transfers

In

Out

Pre-season and friendlies

Competitions

Overall record

La Liga

League table

Results summary

Results by round

Matches 
The league fixtures were announced on 23 June 2022.

Copa del Rey

References

CA Osasuna seasons
Osasuna